The Irwin 27 is an American sailboat that was designed by Ted Irwin as a cruiser and first built in 1967.

Production
The design was built by Irwin Yachts in the United States starting in 1967, but it is now out of production.

The Irwin 27 was the first production boat built by the fledgling company after its founding in 1966. The Irwin 27 followed on from the  racing boat Voodoo that Irwin had constructed in 1963. Irwin had raced the boat from 1964 to 1966 and won 24 of the 28 races that he had competed in. Following the introduction of the Irwin 27, the company went on to build a line of smaller boats and later larger boats, such as the Irwin 41 and the Irwin 41 Citation racer. The company became one of the largest producers of sailboats in the United States. It went through multiple bankruptcies and name changes, before finally closing in 1992.

Design
The Irwin 27 is a recreational keelboat, built predominantly of fiberglass, with wood trim. It has a masthead sloop rig, a raked stem, a raised counter transom, an internally mounted spade-type rudder controlled by a tiller and a stub keel with a centerboard. It can be fitted with a spinnaker and displaces .

The boat was factory-delivered with a Universal Atomic 4 gasoline engine for docking and maneuvering.

The design has sleeping accommodation for five people, with a double "V"-berth in the bow cabin, an "U"-shaped settee with a drop-table on the port side and a quarter-berth starboard aft. The galley is located on the starboard side just forward of the companionway ladder. The galley is a straight design and is equipped with a two-burner stove and a sink. The head is located just aft of the bow cabin on the port side.

Operational history
The boat is supported by an active class club, the Irwin Yacht Owners.

See also
List of sailing boat types

Similar sailboats
Aloha 27
C&C 27
Catalina 27
CS 27
Express 27
Fantasia 27
Halman Horizon
Hotfoot 27
Hullmaster 27
Hunter 27
Hunter 27-2
Island Packet 27
Mirage 27 (Perry)
Mirage 27 (Schmidt)
O'Day 272
Orion 27-2
Tanzer 27
Watkins 27
Watkins 27P

References

External links
Video tour of an Irwin 27

Keelboats
1960s sailboat type designs
Sailing yachts
Sailboat type designs by Ted Irwin
Sailboat types built by Irwin Yachts